Proteasome endopeptidase complex (ingensin, macropain, multicatalytic endopeptidase complex, prosome, multicatalytic proteinase (complex), MCP, proteasome, large multicatalytic protease, proteasome organelle, alkaline protease, 26S protease, tricorn proteinase, tricorn protease) is an enzyme. This enzyme catalyses the following chemical reaction

 Cleavage of peptide bonds with very broad specificity

This 20-S protein is composed of 28 subunits arranged in four rings of seven.

References

External links 
 

EC 3.4.25